Erica Wheeler (born November 28, 1967) is an American athlete. She competed in the women's javelin throw at the 1996 Summer Olympics.

References

External links
 

1967 births
Living people
Athletes (track and field) at the 1996 Summer Olympics
American female javelin throwers
Olympic track and field athletes of the United States
Sportspeople from Pretoria
21st-century American women